The South Bonnie Brae Tract Historic District is a historic district of Victorian houses in Los Angeles, California, along the 1000 block of South Bonnie Brae Street and the 1800 block of West 11th Street in the Pico Union section of the city. The homes in the district date to the 1890s and reflect Queen Anne and Colonial Revival architecture. Based on its well-preserved period architecture, the district was added to the National Register of Historic Places in 1988.

The Athletic Model Guild was located in the district at the intersection of 11th and Bonnie Brae Streets.

See also
 List of Los Angeles Historic-Cultural Monuments in the Wilshire and Westlake areas
 Frederick Mitchell Mooers House — landmark Victorian house 2 blocks north on South Bonnie Brae.
 List of Registered Historic Places in Los Angeles

References

External links

Historic districts in Los Angeles
Los Angeles Historic-Cultural Monuments
National Register of Historic Places in Los Angeles
Pico-Union, Los Angeles
Victorian architecture in California
Historic districts on the National Register of Historic Places in California